U.S. Route 12 (US 12) is a major east–west U.S. Highway, running from Aberdeen, Washington, to Detroit, Michigan.  It spans 430.8 miles across the state of Washington, and is the only numbered highway to span the entire state from west to east, starting near the Pacific Ocean, and crossing the Idaho state line near Clarkston. It crosses the Cascade Range over White Pass, south of Mount Rainier National Park.  Portions of it are concurrent with Interstate 5 (I-5) and Interstate 82 (I-82), although the majority of the route does not parallel any interstate highway.

Although US 12 was not extended into Washington until 1967, portions of it have been part of Washington's state highway system since as early as 1905.  The last part of the highway to open was over White Pass in 1951, although it was added to the state highway system by the legislature in 1931.  Most of the route (except for the approximately 160 miles between Elma and Naches) had been part of the U.S. Highway System since its inception in 1926 as part of U.S. Route 410.  The portion between Napavine and Grand Mound was also designated a U.S. Highway in 1926 as part of U.S. Route 99.

Route description

US 12 begins in downtown Aberdeen on the Pacific Coast as a pair of one-way streets: Heron Street for eastbound traffic and Wishkah Street for westbound traffic. The streets travel from the highway's western terminus at US 101, which continues west to Hoquiam and south to Cosmopolis, across the Wishkah River and merge onto Wishkah Street near a shopping center. US 12 leaves Aberdeen and follows the Chehalis River east through Central Park as a four-lane divided highway. The highway bypasses the towns of Montesano and Elma, which are served by interchanges as well as a junction with SR 107 in the former.

In Elma, US 12 exits at a diamond interchange, while the highway continues east to Olympia as SR 8. US 12 heads southeast towards Oakville and Rochester, still following the Chehalis River.  East of Oakville, US 12 runs north of the Chehalis Indian Reservation. It then continues east through the town of Rochester, and interchanges with I-5 at exit 88 in the town of Grand Mound.

US 12 continues south concurrent with I-5 through Chehalis and Centralia before exiting again at exit 68 south of Napavine. The highway then heads east along the Cowlitz River and passes through the town of Mossyrock, where it intersects SR 122. East of Mossyrock, US 12 runs just north of Mossyrock Dam and Riffe Lake. In the town of Morton, it intersects SR 7, which heads north to Tacoma. It then ascends the Cascade Range, passing south of Mount Rainier, and intersects SR 123, which serves the Stevens Canyon entrance of Mount Rainier National Park. White Pass is the only crossing of the Cascades open year-round between I-90 over Snoqualmie Pass and SR 14 through the Columbia River Gorge.

After it descends the mountains, US 12 intersects SR 410 (formerly US 410) west of Naches, which serves Chinook Pass, Cayuse Pass, and the White River entrance of Mount Rainier National Park.  East of Naches, US 12 widens once again to four lanes as it approaches the city of Yakima.  There, it has an interchange with I-82 and US 97 at exit 31.  US 12 then runs concurrently with I-82, bypassing the towns of Toppenish and Prosser and paralleling the Yakima River, until exit 102 near the Tri-Cities.  At exit 102, it meets the western terminus of Interstate 182.  US 12 and I-182 then run concurrently east over Goose Gap and through the Tri-Cities.  In Pasco, I-182 ends, and US 12 intersects US 395.

US 12 then heads south to the town of Wallula, intersecting US 730, then east to Walla Walla, north to Dodge, and east to Clarkston before crossing the Idaho state line over the Snake River just outside Lewiston.  US 12 through Walla Walla consists of a four-lane bypass, also known as Inland Empire Highway.  The alignment of US 12 through Walla Walla County passes by a number of historical landmarks, such as Whitman Mission and Fort Walla Walla.

History

The Washington section of US 12 was originally developed as a state highway in the early 20th century. It was incorporated into several later highways, including US 410.

Early years

The Washington State Legislature created the State Highway Board in 1905 and appropriated funds to construct—but not maintain—twelve highways in sparsely settled areas of the state. Main highways in more populated areas would continue to be entirely under county control, though sometimes built with 50% state aid. Six of these highways were east-west crossings of the Cascades, including one in the corridor currently served by U.S. Route 12—State Road 5, the Cowlitz Pass State Road, climbing east from a point near Salkum via the Cowlitz River, over Cowlitz Pass, and down towards Yakima. A 1907 amendment renamed State Road 5 the Cowlitz-Natches Road, moved the Cascade crossing north to Carlton Pass, and defined the portion east of the pass to follow the Bumping River and Naches River to a point near Naches. East of the mouth of the American River, this replaced part of State Road 1 (North Yakima and Natches State Road), which had been defined in 1897 to cross the Cascades north of Chinook Pass and included in the 1905 appropriations.

Under a 1909 law, the State Highway Board surveyed a connected network of proposed state roads. Included was a westerly extension of SR 5 via Chehalis to South Bend and Aberdeen and an easterly extension to Pullman. A route from Yakima southeast and east via the Tri-Cities to Idaho was also surveyed, mostly as an extension of State Road 8 (Columbia River Road). The legislature added most of these routes to the state highway system in 1913, when they formed a two-tiered system of primary and secondary roads. Primary roads were completely controlled by the state, including maintenance, and received only names, while secondary roads kept their numbers and county maintenance. The National Park Highway replaced State Road 5 west of Riffe, and extended as surveyed to and beyond South Bend, and the McClellan Pass Highway replaced State Road 1 and continued via State Road 5 to Yakima. The majority of the route from Yakima via Connell to Pullman was not added at that time; it was finally taken over in 1937 as Secondary State Highways 11A and 11B. Only the route via the Tri-Cities, forming part of the Inland Empire Highway, continued from Yakima to Idaho. East of Pomeroy, the original survey had curved south, using State Road 16 to near the Oregon state line; this was bypassed by the 1913 designation, which instead continued directly east to Clarkston. Unlike the earlier state roads, these primary roads mostly followed existing passable county roads. The incomplete roadway between Riffe and the American River remained as part of secondary State Road 5, and the legislature designated the surveyed route from the National Park Highway near Raymond north to Aberdeen as secondary State Road 20 in 1915.

A 1923 restructuring of the system reassigned numbers to almost all the primary state highways. State Road 5 became a primary route and was greatly expanded, taking over the entire McClellan Pass Highway and the National Park Highway east of the Pacific Highway. The former secondary State Road 5 was realigned starting from near Packwood, heading north instead of east, alongside the Ohanapecosh River to the old McClellan Pass Highway at Cayuse Pass, west of the summit of the Cascades. The new State Road 5, named the National Park Highway System, now included four roads in the vicinity of Mount Rainier National Park, but as the road across the Cascades at Chinook Pass was not yet built, these roads did not connect with each other. Also included in this numbering was the designation of the Inland Empire Highway, including Yakima to Clarkston, as State Road 3. In 1925, a spur was added to State Road 9—the Olympic Highway, looping around the Olympic Peninsula—connecting Elma to the Pacific Highway at Grand Mound, and creating a shortcut between the Cowlitz River route and Aberdeen. The Olympic Highway from Elma west to Aberdeen had been added to the state highway system in 1905 west of and 1913 east of Montesano.

U.S. Route 410 
As part of the U.S. Highway system laid out in 1925 and finalized in late 1926, US 410 connected Aberdeen with Clarkston, following the Olympic Highway (State Road 9) to Olympia, the Pacific Highway (State Road 1)—concurrent with US 99—to Tacoma, the National Park Highway System (State Road 5) to Yakima, and the Inland Empire Highway (State Road 3) to Clarkston. This differed from present US 12 between Elma and Naches in that it followed the route through Olympia and Tacoma rather than along the Cowlitz River. However, despite being part of the state highway system since 1897, US 410's crossing of the Cascades, the first between the Columbia River Gorge and Snoqualmie Pass, was not opened to traffic until 1931. A shortcut from near Packwood east across White Pass to Naches, very close to the original plan for the east half of State Road 5, was added to the state highway system in 1931 as another branch of the highway. The roadway between Packwood and Cayuse Pass, added to the state highway system on a different alignment in 1905, was finally completed in 1940, and the White Pass Highway was dedicated on August 12, 1951, opening a shortcut between southwest Washington and Yakima.

When the U.S. Highways were first established in 1926, US 12 ended in Miles City, Montana, and most of US 12's current routing in Washington was followed by US 410. U.S. Route 12 was extended westward in stages; an extension to Lewiston, Idaho, was approved on June 19, 1962.  At various times in the early 1960s, the states of Idaho, Washington, and Oregon submitted plans for further westward extension to the American Association of State Highway Officials (AASHO) to either Vancouver, Washington or Boardman, Oregon—or, a plan submitted in 1963 had the highway going only as far as Pasco—but all of these plans were rejected. Washington introduced a new system of sign route numbers in 1964. While US 410 was still signed as such, present US 12 became State Route 8 between US 410 at Elma and US 99/I-5 at Grand Mound and State Route 14 between US 99/I-5 at Chehalis and US 410 at Naches.

Renumbering and realignments 

The extension of US 12 to Aberdeen was approved on June 20, 1967, with US 12 taking over much of US 410's former routing. However, where US 410 had crossed the Cascades at Chinook Pass, US 12 used the all-weather White Pass, replacing SR 8 and SR 14. Signs were changed in late December 1967, and the bypassed segments of US 410 became a new SR 8 between Elma and Olympia, and SR 410 between Tacoma and Naches. The bypass of Walla Walla was opened on October 17, 1973, despite local opposition that compared the new elevated freeway to the Berlin Wall.

In 1985, US 12 was moved onto I-182 in the Tri-Cities, while its former route through Kennewick was replaced with an extension of SR 240. The change was not formally submitted to the AASHTO until 2006. The White Pass Scenic Byway was designated as a National Scenic Byway in October 2009.

Since 2003, WSDOT has been constructing a four-lane divided highway to replace segments of US 12 between the Tri-Cities and Walla Walla. The $180 million project was broken up into eight phases, of which six have been completed between 2004 and 2012. The seventh phase, bypassing Touchet and constructing  of four-lane highway with two interchanges, began construction in 2021 and is scheduled to be completed in 2023. Construction of the final phase, bypassing Wallula Junction, remains unfunded  and would require an extension of US 730 to a new interchange with US 12.

Major intersections

See also

 U.S. Route 410

References

External links

Highways of Washington State

12
 Washington
012
Transportation in Grays Harbor County, Washington
Transportation in Thurston County, Washington
Transportation in Lewis County, Washington
Transportation in Yakima County, Washington
Transportation in Benton County, Washington
Transportation in Franklin County, Washington
Transportation in Walla Walla County, Washington
Transportation in Columbia County, Washington
Transportation in Garfield County, Washington
Transportation in Asotin County, Washington
Gifford Pinchot National Forest